Samuel John Walker (5 October 1883 – 29 February 1960) was a British gymnast who competed in the 1912 Summer Olympics. He was born in Birmingham, West Midlands. He was part of the British team, which won the bronze medal in the gymnastics men's team, European system event in 1912.

References

External links
Samuel Walker's profile at databaseOlympics
Samuel Walker's profile at Sports Reference.com

1883 births
1960 deaths
Sportspeople from Birmingham, West Midlands
British male artistic gymnasts
Gymnasts at the 1912 Summer Olympics
Olympic gymnasts of Great Britain
Olympic bronze medallists for Great Britain
Olympic medalists in gymnastics
Medalists at the 1912 Summer Olympics